211 (two hundred [and] eleven) is the natural number following 210 and preceding 212. It is also a prime number.

In mathematics
211 is an odd number.
 211 is a primorial prime, the sum of three consecutive primes, a Chen prime, a centered decagonal prime, and a self prime.
 211 is the smallest prime separated by ten or more from the nearest primes (199 and 223). It is thus a balanced prime and an isolated prime.
211 is a repdigit in tetradecimal (111).
In decimal, multiplying 211's digits results in a prime; adding its digits results in a square. Rearranging its digits, 211 becomes 121, which also is a square. Adding any two of 211's digits will result in a prime (2 or 3).
 211 is a super-prime.

In science and technology
2-1-1 is special abbreviated telephone number reserved in Canada and the United States as an easy-to-remember three-digit telephone number. It is meant to provide quick information and referrals to health and human service organizations for both services from charities and from governmental agencies.

In chemistry, 211 is also associated with E211, the preservative sodium benzoate.

In religions 
In Islam, Sermon 211 is about the strength and greatness of Allah.

In other fields 
211 is also the California Penal Code section defining robbery. It is sometimes paired with 187, California PC section for murder.

211 is also an EDI (Electronic data interchange) document known as an Electronic Bill of Lading.

211 is also a nickname for Steel Reserve, a malt liquor alcoholic beverage.

211 is also SMTP status code for system status.

+211 is the code for international direct-dial phone calls to South Sudan.

See also 
 211 Crew

References 

Integers

ca:Nombre 210#Nombres del 211 al 219